Seyqaldeh or Seyqal Deh may refer to:
 Seyqaldeh, Astaneh-ye Ashrafiyeh
 Seyqaldeh, Rudbar